Salvatore J. Grieco (December 5, 1909 – November 7, 1998) was an American politician who served in the New York State Assembly from 1965 to 1972.

References

1909 births
1998 deaths
Democratic Party members of the New York State Assembly
20th-century American politicians